Alameda International Junior/Senior High School is located at 1255 S. Wadsworth Boulevard in Lakewood, Colorado, United States.

It is one of 158 schools in the Jefferson County Public School system, and is a combination junior high and senior high school, containing grades 7-12.

The school's colors are blue and white, and its mascot is a Pirate. The school had a rich basketball history before open enrollment. With the original basketball court and baseball field being one of the older ones in the state.

The mission statement of the school is: "Alameda International delivers a challenging, international education in which students act to create a better and more peaceful world through inquiry, intercultural understanding, and respect."

The 2015-2016 school year was the first year that Alameda functioned as a junior/senior high school. Jefferson County previously converted O'Connell Middle School into an elementary school, and moved its 7th and 8th graders to Alameda.

References

External links
 

Jefferson County Public Schools (Colorado)
Public high schools in Colorado
Public middle schools in Colorado
Buildings and structures in Lakewood, Colorado
Education in Lakewood, Colorado
International Baccalaureate schools in Colorado